Dimitrios Andromedas (17 March 1889 – 17 June 1929) was a Greek hurdler. He competed in the men's 110 metres hurdles at the 1920 Summer Olympics.

References

External links
 

1889 births
1929 deaths
Athletes (track and field) at the 1920 Summer Olympics
Greek male hurdlers
Greek male high jumpers
Greek decathletes
Greek pentathletes
Olympic athletes of Greece
Olympic decathletes
Sportspeople from the Peloponnese
People from Laconia
Greek emigrants to the United States